Ribeira da Janela is a stream in the eastern part of the island of Santo Antão in Cape Verde. The stream flows from southwest to northeast. Its source is east of Pico da Cruz and it empties into the Atlantic Ocean in the settlement Janela, west of the village Pontinha.

See also
List of streams in Cape Verde

References

External links
Photos of the Ribeira da Janela and its valley at ecaboverde.com 

Janela
Paul, Cape Verde
Geography of Santo Antão, Cape Verde